The Green Dot is the license symbol of a European network of industry-funded systems for recycling the packaging materials of consumer goods. The logo is trademark protected worldwide.

Background
The German "Grüner Punkt" is considered the forerunner of the European scheme. It was originally introduced by Duales System Deutschland GmbH (DSD) in 1990 before the introduction of a Packaging Ordinance under the Waste Act. Since the successful introduction of the German industry-funded dual system, similar Green Dot systems have been introduced in most other European countries.

The Green Dot scheme is covered under the European "Packaging and packaging waste directive - 94/62/EC", which is binding on all companies if their products use packaging and requires manufacturers to recover their own packaging. According to the directive, if a company does not join the Green Dot scheme, they must collect recyclable packaging themselves, although this is almost always impossible for mass products and only viable for low-volume producers. Regulatory authorities in individual countries are empowered to fine companies for non-compliance, although enforcement varies by country. Environmentalists claim that some countries deliberately turn a blind eye to the European directive.

Since its European introduction, the scheme has been rolled out to 23 European countries. In some — namely France, Turkey, Spain, Portugal and Bulgaria — companies joining the Green Dot scheme must use the logo.

The Green Dot is used by more than 130,000 companies, encompassing 460 billion packages.

Concept
The Green Dot system was thought up by Klaus Töpfer, Germany's environment minister in the early 1990s. The basic idea of the Green Dot is that consumers who see the logo know that the manufacturer of the product contributes to the cost of recovery and recycling. This can be with household waste collected by the authorities (e.g. in special bags - in Germany these are yellow), or in containers in public places such as car parks and outside supermarkets.

The system is financed by the green dot licence fee paid by the producers of the products. Fees vary by country and are based on the material used in packaging (e.g. paper, plastic, metal, wood, cardboard). Each country also has different fees for joining the scheme and ongoing fixed and variable fees. Fees also take into account the cost of collection, sorting and recycling methods.

In simple terms, the system encourages manufacturers to cut down on packaging as this saves them the cost of licence fees.

German dual system of waste collection
 In 1991, the German government passed a packaging law (Verpackungsverordnung) that requires manufacturers to take care of the recycling or disposal of any packaging material they sell. As a result of this law, German industry set up a "dual system" of waste collection, which picks up household packaging in parallel to the existing municipal waste-collection systems. This industry-funded system is operated in Germany by the Duales System Deutschland GmbH (German for "Dual System Germany Ltd") corporation, or short DSD.

DSD only collects packaging material from manufacturers who pay a license fee to DSD. DSD license fee payers can then add the Green Dot logo to their package labeling to indicate that this package should be placed into the separate yellow bags or yellow wheelie bins that will then be collected and emptied by DSD-operated waste collection vehicles and sorted (and where possible recycled) in DSD facilities.

German licence fees are calculated using the weight of packs, each material type used and the volumes of product produced.

Management
Worldwide stewardship of the Green Dot logo is managed by PRO Europe (Packaging Recovery Organisation Europe) on behalf of the various national Green dot organizations across Europe.

Symbol design and confusion
The design of the Green Dot symbol has obvious links with the Chinese Taijitu (yin and yang) symbol and Gary Anderson's recycling symbol. Where full-color printing is available, its official form is printed in a light and a dark shade of green (Pantone 366C and 343C). For cost reasons or to avoid a visual clash with other symbols, many manufacturers chose a black-and-white or other color combination on their packages.

The Green Dot logo merely indicates that a company has joined the Green Dot scheme, and not necessarily that the package is fully recyclable. The logo is often confused with the recycling logo.

Lawsuits

In Malta, Green Dot Malta Limited, a waste recovery company that is licensed from Der Grune Punkt Duales System Deutschland GmbH to use the Green Dot trademark in Malta, has successfully petitioned the Maltese courts on a number of occasions to protect the mark from free-riders and from competitors seeking to obtain unfair advantage from the international reputation and goodwill that it enjoys.

In February 2009, Smart Supermarket, a well established local supermarket based in Birkirkara, Malta, was ordered by a judge not to sell, manufacture or pack products bearing the trademark Green Dot without the necessary licenses. Green Dot Malta Limited had argued in court that the supermarket was not only blatantly infringing the trademark and contravening the Trademarks Act but was also taking unfair advantage of Green Dot's reputation and goodwill without having its authorisation. The First Hall of the Civil Court, presided over by Madam Justice Abigail Lofaro, upheld Green Dot Malta Limited's request and issued a warrant of prohibitory injunction. Lawyers Antoine Naudi and Victor G. Axiak appeared for Green Dot Malta Limited. Following this injunction, the two parties reached an agreement whereby Smart Supermarket entered into a royalty license agreement with Green Dot Malta Limited and registered all its own branded food items such as confectionery and freshly packed products. they agreed to cooperate. The two companies also agreed to cooperate in ensuring that the intellectual property rights relating to the Green Dot mark in Malta will be further protected from any unlawful use by third parties including suppliers of the various goods to the supermarket.

In April 2009, following a similar request for an injunction filed by Green Dot Malta Limited, the company Zamco Caterware Limited declared in open court that it was binding itself not to circulate any products in the market with the Green Dot symbol on their packaging without the required license. The company also declared that it would not be importing any product bearing the Green Dot mark unless the relative royalty contributions have been paid and unless they prove that the imported product will be recycled in terms of applicable environmental legislation.

In September 2009, Karta Converters Limited, a company which produces and distributes articles made of paper, cardboard and plastic, was ordered by the First Hall of the Civil Court not to manufacture, pack, sell or otherwise continue circulating in the local market products bearing the trademark "Green Dot" without the necessary licenses. Presiding Judge Dr. Geoffrey Valencia accepted Green Dot Malta Limited's assertion that the company was conducting itself as a "free-rider" in the local market and that it was taking an unjust and unfair advantage of Green Dot's reputation without having its consent. Following this injunction, Karta Converters Limited issued a press release whereby it declared that it would be adopting the internationally recognised Green Dot symbol on its paper, carton and plastic products in accordance with the law. Karta Converters also declared that it would be joining some three hundred other companies participating in GreenPak, a waste recovery scheme operated by Green Dot Malta Limited, for the recycling of its packaging.

Out of court settlements have been reached on a number of occasions with various other Maltese companies to ensure that the international reputation of the mark is safeguarded.

In May 2010, Green Dot Malta Limited won a court case against Green.Mt Ltd, a local competitor which operates another waste recovery scheme in Malta. The latter was incorporated in 2007, a few years after Green Dot Malta Limited's registration. Green Dot Malta Limited petitioned the Court to declare that the name Green.Mt Ltd amounted to unfair competition in terms of law since the use of the "." coupled with the words "Green Mt" was intended to cause confusion in the market.

In delivering judgment, Mr. Justice Raymond Pace stated that the two schemes were obviously direct competitors operating in the same field of activity and that the name Green.Mt Ltd was creating confusion in terms of article 32 of Chapter 13 of the Laws of Malta. The court held that the law laid down that businesses could not use any name, mark or symbol which could create confusion with another name, mark or symbol used legally by others. The imitation did not need to be perfect. It was enough that in its entirety it could deceive a consumer. The Judge said that an examination of the words used left him in no doubt that the names could and indeed were creating confusion amongst consumers. The Court thus ordered Green.Mt Ltd to pay Green Dot Malta Limited a nominal sum by way of penalty and to destroy any offending material in its possession bearing the name Green.Mt Ltd within 30 days from date of judgment. Dr. Antoine Naudi and Dr. Victor G. Axiak appeared for Green Dot Malta Limited. Before final judgment was delivered, Green.Mt Ltd changed its name to Green MT Ltd.

See also
Recycling symbol
Japanese recycling symbols
Remondis

References

External links
Der Grüne Punkt – DSD company website
PRO Europe website
Valpak UK – British Green Dot licensing company
The Green Dot: standards of use

Recycling
Waste management concepts
Waste in Europe
Pictograms
Dot, Green (symbol)
Ecolabelling
Symbols introduced in the 1990s